Ibrahim Musa is a Nigerian lawyer who was elected Senator for the Niger North constituency of Niger State, Nigeria in the April 2011 national elections.

Background
Musa practiced as a lawyer for 17 years. While practicing, he was a member of All Nigeria Peoples Party (ANPP). When the CPC emerged, Musa chose to contest for the Niger north senate seat on that platform.

Senatorial career
Running on the platform of the Congress for Progressive Change (CPC), Musa polled 131,872 votes; incumbent Nuhu Aliyu of the People's Democratic Party (PDP) received 83,778 votes.

After the election Nuhu Aliyu, Chairman of the Senate Committee on Security, filed a petition with the Niger state election petition tribunal against Ibrahim Musa.

Musa was arrested in July 2011 for presenting fake documents to the Election Petitions Tribunal in Minna, spending four days in police detention. In September 2011, after his release, Musa said his time incarcerated made him stronger.

Musa has expressed his desire to unseat the PDP in 2015, saying he supported alliances with this goal.

References

Niger State
Living people
Members of the Senate (Nigeria)
Year of birth missing (living people)
Place of birth missing (living people)